Big Cabin is a town in Craig County, Oklahoma, United States. The population was 265 at the 2010 census, a decrease of 9.6 percent from the figure of 293 recorded in 2000.

History
The town was named for a local landmark, a plank cabin, that existed near the place where the Missouri, Kansas and Texas Railway built a switch in 1871–2. The first post office in this part of Indian Territory opened in 1872. (though it was not named Big Cabin until 1892). Some entrepreneurs built a stockyard in the town in 1888. The first two-story frame building was constructed in 1892.  In 1892 the Post Office Department assigned a postal designation to Big Cabin. A school for non-Indian children began in 1895. The railroad built a depot in 1903.

Big Cabin was platted as a town in 1904. It began the process to incorporate in 1926, but did not finish the task until 1958. Meanwhile, the area around Big Cabin became noted for producing hay. A local resident claimed that the town had shipped out more hay between 1893 and 1910 than any other town in the U.S. He claimed that Big Cabin was "the Hay Capital of the World."

Geography
Big Cabin is located near the southern border of Craig County at  (36.544031, -95.220496). U.S. Route 69 passes through the town, leading north  to Vinita, the county seat, and south  to Adair. Interstate 44, the Will Rogers Turnpike, passes just north of the town, with access from Exit 283.

Demographics

As of the census of 2000, there were 293 people, 120 households, and 89 families residing in the town. The racial makeup of the town was 75.77% White, 14.68% Native American, 0.68% Asian, 0.34% from other races, and 8.53% from two or more races. Hispanic or Latino of any race were 1.71% of the population.

There were 120 households, out of which 35.0% had children under the age of 18 living with them, 56.7% were married couples living together, 15.8% had a female householder with no husband present, and 25.8% were non-families. 23.3% of all households were made up of individuals, and 10.0% had someone living alone who was 65 years of age or older. The average household size was 2.44 and the average family size was 2.84.

In the town, the population was spread out, with 25.9% under the age of 18, 9.2% from 18 to 24, 27.6% from 25 to 44, 24.2% from 45 to 64, and 13.0% who were 65 years of age or older. The median age was 34 years. For every 100 females, there were 98.0 males. For every 100 females age 18 and over, there were 92.0 males.

The median income for a household in the town was $30,972, and the median income for a family was $35,000. Males had a median income of $23,750 versus $21,964 for females. The per capita income for the town was $18,165. About 19.6% of families and 18.9% of the population were below the poverty line, including 25.4% of those under the age of 18 and 10.3% of those 65 or over.

Revenue through traffic citations
In 2004 Big Cabin raised nearly three-fourths of its revenue from traffic citations for speeding. The state of Oklahoma enacted a law in 2004 that penalizes towns where the citation revenue exceeds 50% of the annual budget. As a result of a complaint filed by a local business, Oklahoma's Department of Public Safety designated the town a speed trap, and prohibited the town's officers from writing traffic tickets for six months. The police department maintained that enforcement lowered the annual rate of traffic deaths.

Notable people
 Grady Louis McMurtry (b. October 18, 1918 d. July 12, 1985, Martinez, CA), Occultist, Grand Master and Outer Head of Ordo Templi Orientis and Ecclesia Gnostica Catholica, 1971-1985.
 Ralph Terry (1926-2022), American major league professional baseball player.

References

External links
 Encyclopedia of Oklahoma History and Culture - Big Cabin

Towns in Oklahoma
Towns in Craig County, Oklahoma